Cappella-Agnuzzo railway station is a railway station in the municipality of Collina d'Oro in the Swiss canton of Ticino. The station is on the metre gauge Lugano–Ponte Tresa railway (FLP), between Lugano and Ponte Tresa.

The station has a passing loop, with side platforms.

Services 
 the following services stop at Cappella-Agnuzzo:

References

External links 
 

Cappella-Agnuzzo
Ferrovie Luganesi stations